

Laxenburg (Central Bavarian: Laxnbuag) is a market town in the district of Mödling, in the Austrian state of Lower Austria.

History 
Laxenburg became a Habsburg possession in 1333. Duke Albert III (1349–1395) had a hunting lodge erected here (today called Altes Schloss) and vested the settlement with market rights. The castle again decayed afterwards, until in the 17th century it was restored at the behest of Emperor Leopold I. Rebuilt in a Baroque style by the master builder Lodovico Burnacini, it became the centre of extended gardens and pleasure grounds. 

From 1710 onwards the Baroque Blauer Hof (Blue Court), also named Neues Schloss (New Castle), was built according to plans designed by Johann Lucas von Hildebrandt as the residence of the Habsburg vice-chancellor Friedrich Karl von Schönborn. Later Empress Maria Theresa acquired the palace and from 1756 onwards had it lavishly rebuilt by her court architect Nicolò Pacassi with a Rococo interior. Laxenburg became the favourite residence of Maria Theresa and her descendants.

The parish church of Laxenburg was erected vis-à-vis between 1693 and 1703 by Carlo Antonio Carlone. Emperor Leopold I himself laid the founding stone. Consecrated in 1699, construction works continued between 1703 and 1724 supervised by the architect Matthias Steinl. It was the first building north of the Alps containing swung facade components (characteristics of the High Baroque architecture).

After 1780, the castle parks were re-arranged as an English landscape garden. It contains several artificial ponds, and, on an island, Franzensburg Castle, named after emperor Francis I of Austria.

The current political municipality was established after the 1848 revolutions. In 1854, Emperor Francis Joseph and his consort Elisabeth spent their honeymoon in Laxenburg. Two of their children, Gisela and Crown Prince Rudolf, were born here. After the dissolution of the Austro-Hungarian monarchy in 1919, the city of Vienna took over the war-damaged castle. Since then, the city of Vienna became the property owner of the park area.

After the Austrian Anschluss to Nazi Germany in 1938, the municipality of Laxenburg temporarily was incorporated into the city of Greater Vienna. After World War II, castles and park were seized by Soviet occupation forces. Upon the 1955 Austrian State Treaty, the place became independent again and returned to the state of Lower Austria.

Plans to hold the 1967 World's fair in Laxenburg failed. Since 1973, the International Institute for Applied Systems Analysis (IIASA), a non-governmental research organization with about 200 employees, has been located in the castle. The International Anti-Corruption Academy (IACA) is also headquartered in Laxenburg, since it was established in 2010 at the historic Palais Kaunitz-Wittgenstein. The International Federation for Information Processing (IFIP) and the International Federation of Automatic Control (IFAC) both have their respective secretariat in the city. The Altes Schloss today houses the Filmarchiv Austria.

Population

Politics 
David Berl from the Austrian People's Party (Österreichische Volkspartei, ÖVP) is Laxenburg's mayor.

Seats in the municipal assembly (Gemeinderat) as of 2015 local elections:
Austrian People's Party (ÖVP): 16
Social Democratic Party of Austria (SPÖ): 2
The Greens: 2
Freedom Party of Austria (FPÖ): 1

Notable people 

 Johann Natterer, (9 November 1787, in Laxenburg - 17 June 1843, in Vienna) - Austrian zoologist and naturalist.
 Gisela Louise Marie von Österreich, (15 July 1856, in Laxenburg - 27 July 1932, in Munich), Archduchess of Austria-Hungary, daughter of Kaiser Franz Josef I and Kaiserin Elisabeth.
 Crown Prince Rudolf (21 August 1858, in Laxenburg - 30 January 1889, in Mayerling) - son of Kaiser Franz Josef I and Kaiserin Elisabeth.
 Elisabeth Marie von Österreich, daughter of Crown Prince Rudolf.
 Eduard Hartmann (3 September 1904 - 14 October 1966), Austrian politician: Abg. zum Nationalrat (8 November 1949, 27 March 1963); Bundesminister für Land- und Forstwirtschaft (16 July 1959 to 2 April 1964); Landeshauptmann von Niederösterreich (1965–1966).

Twin cities 
  Gödöllő, Hungary

References

Further reading

External links 

Municipal website
Entry on Aeiou Encyclopedia

Cities and towns in Mödling District